Rose Muhando known professionally as Rose Muhando, (b. January 1976) is a Tanzanian Gospel singer, songwriter and choreographer, respected as Queen of gospel music. She was born and raised in Kilosa district, Morogoro region, Tanzania.

Background 
Muhando, a former devout Muslim and mother of three, claims to have seen a vision of Jesus Christ while indisposed on her sick bed at the age of nine, having suffered for three years, after which she was healed and later converted to Christianity.

Career
Muhando started her music career as a choir teacher in Dodoma's Saint Mary's Choir for the Chimuli Anglican Church.

On 31 January 2005, she won best composer, best singer, and best album of the year at the Tanzania Gospel Music Award Concert.

In December 2005 she participated in a gospel concert to help raise funds for a Dar es Salaam orphanage.

In February 2011 Muhando signed a multi-album recording deal with Sony Music. The signing was announced at a press conference in Dar es Salaam, Tanzania, on 9 February and was the first deal of its kind for East Africa.

After a hiatus of about 5 years Rose Muhando returned in people's scene with her new Hit Gospel album 'Secret Agenda' in December 2022. The album had biggest hits like 'Secret Agenda' a title track and 'Kama Mbaya Mbaya'.

Discography 
 Mteule Uwe Macho (2004)
 Kitimutimu (2005)
 Jipange Sawasawa (2008)<ref
name="2004-arushatimes-mhando"></ref>
 Nyota ya Ajabu (2011)
 Utamu Wa Yesu (2011)
 Mungu Anacheka (2015)
 Nampenda Yesu (2017)
 Jitenge Na Lutu (2017)
 Hangriema with her choir (2017)
 Usife Moyo (2018)
 Secret Agenda (2022)

Awards
2005 Tanzania Music Awards: Best Female Vocalist & Best Religious Song ("Mteule uwe macho")
2009 The Best Tanzanian Gospel Singer Awards: Rose Mhando; The Best Singer in Tanzania, awarded Tsh 200,000 by Tanzania Broadcasting Corporation TBC under the umbrella of her song "Nibebe"
2008 Kenya Groove Awards - best female gospel artist in Africa

References 

ArtMatters.Info. (2008.02.03). 'Leading Tanzanian Musicians Saida Karoli and Rose Mhando Release New Albums'. Retrieved 2012.08.23.
http://wapotz.org/blog/2010/01/09/rosemhando (Swahili)

1976 births
Living people
21st-century Tanzanian women singers
Tanzanian gospel singers